The province of Bologna was a province in the Emilia-Romagna region of Italy. Its provincial capital was the city of Bologna. It was replaced by the Metropolitan City of Bologna starting from January 2015.

Geography
The province of Bologna was one of nine provinces in the region of Emilia-Romagna in northwestern Italy from 1859 to 2014. It was bounded on the east by the Province of Ravenna, the Province of Ferrara lies to the north and the Province of Modena lies to the west. To the south were the Province of Florence, the Province of Prato and the Province of Pistoia, all in the region of Tuscany.

List of comuni 

 Alto Reno Terme
 Anzola dell'Emilia
 Argelato
 Baricella
 Bentivoglio
 Bologna
 Borgo Tossignano
 Budrio
 Calderara di Reno
 Camugnano
 Casalecchio di Reno
 Casalfiumanese
 Castel d'Aiano
 Castel del Rio
 Castel di Casio
 Castel Guelfo di Bologna
 Castel Maggiore
 Castel San Pietro Terme
 Castello d'Argile
 Castenaso
 Castiglione dei Pepoli
 Crevalcore
 Dozza
 Fontanelice
 Gaggio Montano
 Galliera
 Granarolo dell'Emilia
 Grizzana Morandi
 Imola
 Lizzano in Belvedere
 Loiano
 Malalbergo
 Marzabotto
 Medicina
 Minerbio
 Molinella
 Monghidoro
 Monte San Pietro
 Monterenzio
 Monzuno
 Mordano
 Ozzano dell'Emilia
 Pianoro
 Pieve di Cento
 Sala Bolognese
 San Benedetto Val di Sambro
 San Giorgio di Piano
 San Giovanni in Persiceto
 San Lazzaro di Savena
 San Pietro in Casale
 Sant'Agata Bolognese
 Sasso Marconi
 Valsamoggia
 Vergato
 Zola Predosa

References

External links
Provincia di Bologna. 

 
.
Bologna
2015 disestablishments in Italy
States and territories disestablished in 2015
Geography of Emilia-Romagna
History of Emilia-Romagna